Abdal Latif Sultan (Afak Khan) was the ruler of the Yarkand Khanate in what is now northwest China (Xinjiang) between 1618 and 1630. He was second son of Shudja ad-Din Ahmad Khan, and was only 13 when he became khan.  Afak Khan died in 1630 at the age of 25.

In 1644 Balkh historian Mahmud ibn Vali wrote that Afak Khan ruled for 12 years. Mahmud ibn Vali's book, "Bahr al-Asrar" ( "Sea of Mysteries"), was written in 7 parts between 1641 and 1644 in Balkh. Each part contained 4 chapters. The second chapter of 7th part described the rulers of the Yarkand Khanate, or the country of Kashgar and Uyghurstan as he called it, from the time of Sultan Said Khan to the time of Abdal Latif Sultan (Afak Khan).

Genealogy of Chaghatai Khanate

In Babr Nama, which was written by the first Mughal emperor Babur, Chapter 1, Page 19, described the genealogy of his maternal grandfather Yunas Khan as:

{| class="wikitable " style="margin:1em auto 1em auto; page-break-inside:avoid"
|+ Genealogy of Abdul Karim Khan according to Tarikh-i-Rashidi of Mirza Muhammad Haidar Dughlat
|- valign="top"
| style="border:none;"| Chingiz Khan
Chaghatai Khan
Mutukan
Yesü Nto'a
Ghiyas-ud-din Baraq
Duwa
Esen Buqa I
| style="border:none"| <ol start="8">
Tughlugh Timur
Khizr Khoja
Muhammad Khan (Khan of Moghulistan)
Shir Ali Oglan
Uwais Khan(Vaise Khan)
Yunus Khan
Ahmad Alaq</li>
</ol>
| style="border:none"| Sultan Said Khan
Abdurashid Khan
Muhammad Sultan
Shudja ad Din Ahmad Khan
Abdal Latif Sultan (Afak Khan)
|}

See also
List of khans of the Yarkent Khanate

Notes

 References 
 Beveridge, Annette Susannah. The Babur Nama in English, Zahiru'd-din Mubammad Babur Padshah Ghdzt
 Kutlukov M (1990). About foundation of Yarkand Khanate (1465-1759). Almata. "Pan" publish house.
 Millward, James A. Eurasian Crossroads: A History of Xinjiang
 Millward, James A. (1998). Beyond the pass: economy, ethnicity, and empire in Qing Central Asia, 1759–1864. Stanford University Press. p. 298. . Retrieved 2010-11-28.
 Newby, Laura (2005). The Empire and the Khanate: a political history of Qing relations with Khoqand c. 1760–1860. BRILL. p. 97. . Retrieved 2010-11-28.
 Shah Mahmud Churas Chronicles'' (written in 1670 in Yarkand) Translation and research by Akimushkin O.F. Publishing house of Eastern literature " Nauka", Moscow, 1976

Year of birth missing
1630 deaths
Khans
Yarkent Khanate